A cardie is a shortened form of the word for a cardigan, a type of sweater. 

Cardie may refer to:
Cardie, listed by Servius as one of the Hyades in Greek mythology
Cardie, a fictional character in 2016 comedy film Folk Hero & Funny Guy
Cardie Primary School, in Foix, France
Claire Cardie (1982–2019), American computer scientist

See also
Cardi, a surname
Kardi (disambiguation)
McCardie, a surname